Senator Webb may refer to:

Members of the United States Senate
Jim Webb (born 1946), U.S. Senator from Virginia
William R. Webb (1842–1926), U.S. Senator from Tennessee

United States state senate members
Benjamin Joseph Webb (1814–1897), Kentucky State Senate
Charles M. Webb (1833–1911), Wisconsin State Senate
Doyle Webb (born 1955), Arkansas State Senate
Edmund F. Webb (1835–1898), Maine State Senate
Edwin Y. Webb (1872–1955), North Carolina State Senate
J. Griswold Webb (1890–1934), New York State Senate
Julian Webb (1911–2002), Georgia State Senate
M. Price Webb (1862–1938), Virginia State Senate
Robin L. Webb (born 1960), Kentucky State Senate
Roger Webb (politician) (fl. 2010s), Montana State Senate
Stephen Palfrey Webb (1804–1879), Massachusetts and California

Other foreign senate members
Freddie Webb (born 1942), Senate of the Philippines

See also
Anthony Webbe (Missouri politician) (1901–1953), Missouri State Senate